"The Target" is the series premiere of the HBO original series The Wire. The episode was written by David Simon from a story by Simon and Ed Burns and was directed by Clark Johnson. It originally aired on June 2, 2002. The title refers to Detective Jimmy McNulty  setting his sights on Stringer Bell and Avon Barksdale's drug-dealing organization as the target of an investigation.

Plot summary
 
Baltimore narcotics detective Jimmy McNulty investigates the murder of Omar "Snot Boogie" Betts, a "rip and run" kid who was shot while attempting to rob a back alley craps game. An eyewitness describes to McNulty the illogical, but to that point accepted, pattern of the regulars allowing Snot Boogie to join the game each week, knowing in advance he would rob it, followed by their chasing him down to beat him and retrieve their money. McNulty, "in exchange for some Grape Nehi and a few Newports", persuades the witness to testify in court. The following day, McNulty observes the courtroom trial of D'Angelo Barksdale, a young drug dealer charged with killing a low-ranking gang member. One of the two witnesses, a security guard named Nakeesha Lyles, changes her story on the stand and refuses to identify D'Angelo, resulting in an acquittal.

McNulty vents his frustration to Judge Daniel Phelan about the Baltimore Police Department's failure to investigate D'Angelo's uncle Avon and his right-hand man Stringer Bell, who are major players in West Baltimore's drug trade. Phelan makes a call to Deputy Commissioner Ervin Burrell. Later, Major William Rawls, incensed that McNulty went around the chain of command, forces him to write a report for Burrell about the Barksdale murders. Sergeant Jay Landsman warns McNulty that his behavior could end with reassignment. He asks where McNulty would not want to be reassigned, and McNulty admits he dreads being posted to the harbor patrol unit.

Wee-Bey Brice drives D'Angelo to Orlando's strip club, a front for the Barksdale Organization. When D'Angelo discusses the trial in Wee-Bey's car, Wee-Bey curtly reminds him not to discuss business in the car or on the phone, in case both are being monitored. Avon chides D'Angelo for committing a needless public murder, costing the organization time, effort, and money. D'Angelo also meets a stripper called Shardene Innes. When D'Angelo arrives at the high-rise Franklin Terrace housing projects, Stringer tells him he has been demoted to heading a crew in the low-rise projects, dubbed "the Pit." This new crew includes Bodie Broadus, Poot Carr, and young Wallace.

Narcotics lieutenant Cedric Daniels is tasked by Burrell with organizing a detail to investigate the Barksdales. Burrell wants to keep the investigation quick and simple, appeasing Phelan without becoming drawn into a protracted case. Daniels brings narcotics detectives Kima Greggs, Thomas "Herc" Hauk, and Ellis Carver with him. Rawls sends McNulty and Michael Santangelo, one of Homicide's more inept detectives. McNulty's FBI contact, Agent Terrance "Fitz" Fitzhugh, shows him the Bureau's far superior surveillance equipment, but explains that their drug investigations are winding down due to the War on Terror. McNulty objects to Daniels' plan of buy busts and suggests using a wiretap to get a conviction. However, Daniels insists on a fast-paced investigation, suggesting that the detail looks at old murders tied to the Barksdales.

McNulty goes drinking with his Homicide partner Bunk Moreland and complains about his ex-wife, who makes it difficult for him to see his two sons. Greggs returns home to her partner Cheryl. A heroin addict called Bubbles and his protege, Johnny Weeks, buy drugs with counterfeit money, but when they try to repeat the scam, Bodie leads the crew in beating Johnny. Bubbles is also a confidential informant for Greggs, and agrees to give her information on the Barksdales as revenge for the beating. At the start of his second day working the Pit, D'Angelo is shocked to find the murdered body of William Gant, another witness at his trial, lying in the street.

Production

Epigraph

This line is taken from a conversation in which McNulty criticizes his colleague Bunk Moreland for taking on a homicide case that he could have avoided – it not being his turn in the rotation to take the next case. Bunk took the case because he knew the corpse was found in a house, which statistically gave him a much better chance of solving the case than if the victim had been found outdoors. The conversation is ironic since McNulty has broken the rules in a much more serious fashion by circumventing the chain of command.

Commentary
The DVD release featured a commentary track recorded by creator and writer/producer David Simon. Simon discusses the season's novelistic structure and the theme of the corrupting influence of the institutions that the characters have committed to. He mentions many real-life inspirations for events and characters on the show.

He discusses the technique of using surveillance methods within shots (TV monitors, security cameras etc.) to give the sense of always being watched and a need to process the vast amount of information available to the show's detective characters. He also talks about trying to ground the show in realism by using only diegetic music.

Throughout the commentary, Simon tries to distinguish The Wire from other television crime dramas. He makes the point that the detectives are motivated not by a desire to protect and serve but by the intellectual vanity of believing they are smarter than the criminals they are chasing.

At the end of the episode, when the body of Gant is found, there is a brief flashback to the trial, re-identifying the character for the audience.  David Simon cites it as one of the few things HBO urged them to do, to make sure audiences recognized the character.  Although Simon concedes that 'maybe they were right', he says that they were reluctant to put it in as it broke from the style of the show.  The show's storytelling has been entirely linear ever since.

Non-fictional elements
Both the Snot Boogie murder story and Bunk's tale of shooting a mouse in his kitchen are anecdotes from Simon's time researching his non-fiction book Homicide: A Year on the Killing Streets (1991). A real police officer named Jay Landsman is also a character in the book.

Reviewers have noted the pilot's grounding in the non-fiction political climate. The San Francisco Chronicle commented that the show had forecast a reduction of the FBI's attention to the War on Drugs because of the competing War on Terror.  Simon confirms that the pilot was shot only a few weeks after 9/11, but that the writers correctly predicted what the FBI's response would be.

Locations
The opening scene (the Snot Boogie crime scene) was filmed at the corner of Fulton and Lexington in West Baltimore. The scenes set at Orlando's gentleman's club were filmed at the Ritz Cabaret in Fells Point.

Credits

Starring cast
The credited starring cast consists of Dominic West (Jimmy McNulty), John Doman (William Rawls), Idris Elba (Stringer Bell), Frankie Faison (Ervin Burrell), Larry Gilliard, Jr. (D'Angelo Barksdale), Wood Harris (Avon Barksdale), Deirdre Lovejoy (Assistant State's Attorney Rhonda Pearlman), Wendell Pierce (Bunk Moreland), Lance Reddick (Cedric Daniels), Andre Royo (Bubbles), and Sonja Sohn (Kima Greggs).

Guest stars

 Peter Gerety as Judge Daniel Phelan
 Seth Gilliam as Detective Ellis Carver
 Domenick Lombardozzi as Detective Thomas "Herc" Hauk
 Leo Fitzpatrick as Johnny Weeks
 J. D. Williams as Preston "Bodie" Broadus
 Hassan Johnson as Roland "Wee-Bey" Brice
 Michael B. Jordan as Wallace
 Clayton LeBouef as Wendell "Orlando" Blocker
 Melanie Nicholls-King as Cheryl
 Doug Olear as FBI Special Agent Terrance "Fitz" Fitzhugh

 Delaney Williams as Sergeant Jay Landsman
 Richard De Angelis as Major Raymond Foerster	
 Wendy Grantham as Shardene Innes
 Michael Kostroff as Maurice Levy
 Michael Salconi as Detective Michael Santangelo
 Ingrid Cornell as Nakeesha Lyles
 Larry Hull as William Gant
 Lucy Newman-Williams as Assistant State's Attorney Taryn Hansen
 Michael Stone Forrest as Detective Frank Barlow

The episode introduces many characters who are important over the course of the series, despite only being credited as guest stars. Domenick Lombardozzi plays Herc. Leo Fitzpatrick plays homeless, hapless drug addict Johnny Weeks. Hassan Johnson plays criminal enforcer Wee-Bey Brice. Michael B. Jordan plays naive sixteen-year-old drug dealer Wallace. Melanie Nicholls-King plays Detective Greggs' domestic partner Cheryl. Doug Olear plays FBI Special Agent Terrence "Fitz" Fitzhugh. Richard DeAngelis plays Major Raymond Foerster. Wendy Grantham plays stripper Shardene Innes. Michael Kostroff plays defense lawyer Maurice Levy. Michael Salconi plays Detective Michael Santangelo.

Reviewers have noted that several actors appearing in the series have previously appeared in Homicide: Life on the Street and Oz. In addition to Reddick and Harris, Oz alumni include Seth Gilliam (Ellis Carver) and J.D. Williams (Bodie Broadus). Peter Gerety (Judge Phelan) and Clayton LeBouef (Orlando) were both major characters on Homicide, on which Delaney Williams (Sgt. Jay Landsman) had also appeared. This episode was the first of several directed by Clark Johnson, also an alumnus of Homicide. The Corner star Larry Hull appears as maintenance man and witness William Gant.

Reception
The Guardian Unlimited review noted the pilot episode established the series' themes of institutional dysfunction, the ineffectiveness of the War on Drugs and novelistic structure. The review compared the series to Richard Price's 1992 novel Clockers and wondered if the pace could be sustained for an entire season. The review picked out the characters of Jimmy and Avon as particularly significant. An Entertainment Weekly reviewer praised Johnson's direction of the episode and credited him with drawing subtle performances out of Gerety and Reddick. Tim Goodman of The San Francisco Chronicle characterized the show as another success for the HBO network and a well-produced and complex subversion of the cops and robbers genre. He credited Simon's reporter's eye for detail for the series' verisimilitude. He also noted the series themes of institutional dysfunction, the ineffectiveness of the War on Drugs, and novelistic structure. A separate Chronicle article highlighted the theme of institutional dysfunction through the comparable experience of characters on opposite sides of the law using Jimmy and D'Angelo as examples. The review also made favorable comparisons between the show and Simon's previous work on Homicide: Life on the Street, attributing the improvement to the switch to cable television for The Wire from the NBC network who produced Homicide.

The Pittsburgh Post-Gazette was more critical of the show. They stated that the producers' expectations that the audience would have the patience for a complex, morally ambiguous, and slowly unfolding story might prove unfounded. They noted the cast members from Homicide and Oz and described The Wire as less accessible than either of these shows and also compared the pacing to Farscape. They praised the performances of some of the cast and said that the show had moments that drew the viewer in but ultimately required too much of its audience. The New York Times also felt that the show "went out of its way to be choppy and confusing" and eschewed conventions of signposting the introduction of characters and obvious exposition but commented that while some viewers may be alienated others would find this refreshing. They noted the theme of institutional dysfunction and the use of parallel storylines for characters in different organizations to highlight this, citing the pariah status of Jimmy and D'Angelo. The review also criticized the show's attempts at realistic dialogue, saying that it often seemed self-conscious, and the examination of the detectives' personal lives, saying that it had been done before. The review stated that the show's success would hinge not on its apparent high quality but on the tolerance of the viewer for the complexity of the continuing narrative, which they characterized as considerably more downbeat than high-octane shows like 24.

The opening scene at the Snot Boogie crime scene has been praised as being a "perfectly crafted set-up" for the series' themes of institutional dysfunction, devaluing human life, and epitomizing the bleak humor of the show.

References

External links
 "The Target" at HBO.com
 

The Wire (season 1) episodes
2002 American television episodes
American television series premieres
Television episodes directed by Clark Johnson
Television episodes written by David Simon